Jacob Collins (born 1964) is an American realist painter working in New York City. He is a leading figure of the contemporary classical art revival.

He has founded several schools of art including the Water Street Atelier, the Grand Central Academy of Art and the Hudson River Fellowship.

Life
Jacob Collins was born on August 11, 1964, in New York City. He comes from a family of artists and scholars. His great-uncle was Meyer Schapiro. As a child, he started copying works by Old Masters in the Metropolitan Museum of Art. From a young age, Collins knew that he wanted to be an artist, although his interest and skill lay in a classical style that was out of favor in the late 20th century. Moving away from Modernism, he identified instead with works of 15th–19th century masters and their techniques and aesthetics.

He studied in Europe and at the New York Studio School following his graduation from The Dalton School.  He earned a BA in History from Columbia, attended the New York Academy of Art (NYAA) and the Art Students League of New York. His teachers included painters Aaron Kurzen, Ted Seth Jacobs, and Michael Aviano and the sculptor Martine Vaugel. This education brought together Collins' modernist background and his classical inclinations. He also copied from the masters at the Musée du Louvre, the Museo del Prado and the Uffizi Gallery.

After his studies, his New York studio became the center of a new evolving classical art scene.  These painters worked to regain the skills and spirit of Classical art. A number of them have gone on to successful careers and leadership roles in the traditional realist art movement. The Paint Group at Hirschl & Adler Modern in New York, NY was a significant exhibition of the works of this group. During this period, Collins painted portrait commissions and started showing professionally at the Salander-O'Reilly Galleries in New York City.

As of March 2020, he was living and painting in his Upper East Side townhouse.
He and his wife, the writer Ann Brashares, have four children.

Tutoring and schools 

Jacob Collins has been teaching students of art for many years.  In the 1990s, he was teaching night classes at the National Academy of Art, as well as "taking in the most promising students for private study."
In the early 1990s, he founded the Water Street Atelier, which has trained dozens of artists in a classical manner. He was the director of the Grand Central Academy of Art, a new school in New York City and a hub of the classical revival art scene. The Grand Central Academy operated in affiliation with the Institute of Classical Architecture & Classical America.

By the early 2000s, Collins' school was located on the ground floor of his "Upper East Side carriage house [which was formerly] the headquarters of a then-traditional school called the Sculpture Center." In 2007, he created the Hudson River Fellowship. The purpose of this school is to facilitate the building of a new movement of American art, modeling itself after the artistic, social and spiritual values of the Hudson River School painters.

In 2014, he opened up his largest campus yet in a -converted warehouse in Long Island City, near the Museum of Modern Art satellite PS1.  The facility serves as another of Collins' art schools, as well as " an art incubator, and an artist clubhouse for at least 50 painters who have come out of Collins’s intense multiyear program over the past two decades, along with hundreds of students who now [attend] his classes and workshops."

Work

Jacob Collins's style is considered Classical Realism, and his subject matter focuses on the figure, portraiture, still life and landscape as well as the occasional interior. Collins' nude figurative works, especially, reveal a point of view that is distinctly contemporary, and his setups are simple, incorporating at most a bed sheet and a length of fabric.

Collins' drawings and paintings have been shown with museums and galleries in North America and Europe, and he has been commissioned to paint portraits of J. Paul Getty Jr., President George H. W. Bush and U.S. Supreme Court Chief Justice Warren E. Burger. Collins is represented by Adelson Galleries (New York), the John Pence Gallery (San Francisco) and Meredith Long & Co. (Houston).

Public collections
Fogg Art Museum, Harvard University Art Museums, Cambridge, Massachusetts
The Forbes Collection, New York
John Pence Gallery, San Francisco
Private Collection of Ann and Gordon Getty, California
Mead Art Museum, Amherst College, Amherst, Massachusetts
Steinway Hall, New York
The Union League Club, New York
U.S. Trust, New York
The Wharton School of the University of Pennsylvania, Philadelphia
Yale Law School, New Haven, Connecticut
New Britain Museum of American Art, Connecticut

References

External links
Jacob Collins’ Official Website
Jacob Collins: Still Lifes exhibition
Jacob Collins: Figures exhibition
Jacob Collins: Recent Paintings exhibition
The Grand Central Academy of Art
The Hudson River Fellowship

1964 births
Living people
20th-century American painters
American male painters
21st-century American painters
21st-century American male artists
People from the Upper East Side
Columbia College (New York) alumni
Painters from New York City
20th-century American male artists